Yanghe Subdistrict is a subdistrict in Yufeng District, Liuzhou, Guangxi, China. , it administers the following four residential neighborhoods and two villages:
Neighborhoods
Xincheng Community
Chunyuan Community
Cuihu Community
Dongjin Community

Villages
Yanghe Village
Shewan Village

See also 
 List of township-level divisions of Guangxi

References 

Township-level divisions of Guangxi
Liuzhou
Subdistricts of the People's Republic of China